Oleski is a village in Võru Parish, Võru County in southeastern Estonia. It has a population of 17 and an area of 4.3 km².

References

Villages in Võru County
Võru Parish